Phylloxiphia oberthueri is a moth of the family Sphingidae. It is known from lowland forests from Liberia and Ivory Coast east to the Democratic Republic of the Congo.

References

Phylloxiphia
Moths described in 1903
Insects of Cameroon
Insects of the Democratic Republic of the Congo
Fauna of the Central African Republic
Fauna of the Republic of the Congo
Fauna of Gabon
Insects of West Africa
Moths of Africa